The 1964 America's Cup was held in September 1964 at Newport, Rhode Island. The US defender, Constellation, skippered by Bob Bavier, defeated the British challenger, Sovereign, skippered by Peter Scott, in a four-race sweep.

Constellation had beaten Columbia, Easterner and Nefertiti, and American Eagle''' to become the defender. Sovereign had beaten Kurrewa'' to become the challenger.

References 

 
1964
America's Cup
America's Cup